The 2022 North Alabama Lions football team represented the University of North Alabama during the 2022 NCAA Division I FCS football season. The Lions played their home games at the Braly Municipal Stadium in Florence, Alabama. The team was coached by sixth-year head coach Chris Willis.

Previous season

The Lions finished the 2021 season with 3–8 overall record, 3–4 in Big South play to finish in a 4 way tie for third place.

Schedule

Game summaries

at Indiana State

UVA–Wise

at No. 10 Chattanooga

Tarleton State

at Kennesaw State

vs Jacksonville State

at Eastern Kentucky

at Central Arkansas

Austin Peay

Tennessee Tech

at Memphis

References

North Alabama
North Alabama Lions football seasons
North Alabama Lions football